Haji Ahmad Bin Hassan is a Malaysian politician who has served as the Member of Parliament (MP) for Papar since May 2018. He is a member of the Association of Southeast Asian Nations Inter-Parliamentary Assembly (ASEAN IPA or AIPA) and a member of the Public Accounts Committee (PAC). He is also a member of the opposition Heritage Party (WARISAN). He is a member of the Supreme Council and Division Chairman of Papar of WARISAN.

Elections

2018 general election 
In the 2018 election, his party of Sabah Heritage Party (WARISAN) field him to contest the Papar parliamentary seat, facing the seat defending candidate Rosnah Shirlin from the United Malays National Organisation (UMNO) and subsequently won.

Election results

References 

Living people
People from Sabah
Malaysian people of Bruneian descent
Members of the Dewan Rakyat
Sabah Heritage Party politicians
Malaysian people of Malay descent
1960 births